The Dunkeld Lectern is a mediaeval lectern which was one of the most prized possessions of St Stephen's Church, St Albans, England.  The 150 kg brass reading desk stands approximately 1.6 metres high and takes the form of a large eagle with outspread wings, with the bird perched on an orb supported by a turned shaft: an eagle lectern.  Engraved on the orb is a Latin inscription Georgius Creichton Episcopus Dunkeldensis (translation: 'George Creichton Bishop of Dunkeld'). 

The lectern was looted from Holyrood Abbey by the English army in 1544 and found its way to the St Albans church. Requests from Scotland for its repatriation were rebuffed. In 1984, it was taken from the church by a Scottish nationalist group and did not reappear until 1999. Since then it has been on display at the National Museum of Scotland, although its ownership remains in dispute.

Origin
George Crichton was abbot at Holyrood Abbey, Edinburgh from 1515 to 1528. He was, it is commonly stated, presented with the lectern at the time of the visit of Pope Alexander VI to mark Crichton's being made Bishop of Dunkeld. There are questions about this claim, as, in fact, Pope Alexander VI had died two decades previously, in 1503. Crichton allegedly, in turn, presented it to Holyrood Abbey. The lectern was plundered from Edinburgh by the troops of Sir Richard Lee in 1544.

History

In the autumn of 1543, Scotland and England signed two agreements which are often referred to as "The Treaties of Greenwich".  The first guaranteed peace between the two countries for a fixed period of time and the second affirmed that an arranged marriage would take place between Prince Edward of England, the son of Henry VIII, and Mary, Queen of Scots, soon after her tenth birthday.

At the beginning of 1544 the relationship between England and Scotland began to worsen as it had done so many times before. The Scots reneged on the treaties which drove Henry VIII into a fury.  His response was swift and brutal. He directed the commander-in-chief of the English army, the Earl of Hertford to "... put all to fyre and sworde, burne Edinborough town... [so it] may remayn forever a perpetuel memory of the vengeance of God... for their [the Scots] faulsehode and disloyailtye... over throwe the castle, sack Holyrod house".

In May 1544, the English army arrived by boat to destroy Edinburgh. The army landed near the port of Leith from whence it marched on Edinburgh.  The invaders pillaged and laid waste the town, and the surrounding areas and villages, excepting only the castle.  They destroyed Holyrood Abbey and carried off much of its property as plunder.  Henry hoped his aggression would force the Scots to accept the marriage treaty.

The Earl of Hertford was accompanied to Edinburgh by Sir Richard Lee who was a military engineer - a destroyer and builder of fortifications.  His services to the English crown for his work in Scotland (and elsewhere) was formally recognised in 1544 when he was knighted and appointed Surveyor of the King's Works. He was granted the ground covered by St Albans monastery (but not the church which was bought by the townspeople), Sopwell Priory, and the rectorship of St Stephen's church.

This fact, when taken with circumstantial evidence, suggests it was probably at this time the Holyrood Abbey lectern found its way into this Hertfordshire church, with the other Scottish plunder of Sir Richard Lee.

English Civil War
In 1642, the English Civil War began and St Albans became a Parliamentarian stronghold. Parliament passed new laws which authorised the destruction of religious images and articles. In response many religious items and artefacts were hidden by Anglican clergy from their Puritan prosecutors.  In August 1643, more draconian measures were introduced and continuity of the St Stephen's parish registers is broken perhaps hinting at the turbulent nature of those times. It was during this period of national upheaval that the lectern disappeared. Who removed it and exactly why remains a mystery to this day. Over 100 years were to pass before the lectern came to light once more.

In 1748, the Montagu family tomb in the chancel of St Stephen's church was opened up for an interment and the lectern was found lying in the grave. It was retrieved and brought back into use.

Scottish requests for return

Since the eighteenth century, Scottish academics, clergy and patriots have sought the return of the lectern.  A review of the history of the lectern in the newspaper The Scottish Guardian, dated 2 May 1879, finished with a plea for readers to find a way to "... secure the lectern for our new Cathedral in Edinburgh.  Who will take up the matter?"

In November 1879, an approach from the Lord Provost of Edinburgh was rebuffed by the vicar of St Stephen's, the Rev Marcus R. Southwell. In December of that year he wrote to the Lord Provost, sent his best wishes and expressed the "utmost repugnance to parting with the Crichton lectern."  The Dean of the Order of the Thistle and Chapel Royal fared no better in 1914.  Nor did further approaches made by Edinburgh Corporation in 1931 and 1936.

Attempted repatriation
One day in 1972 the lectern was found lying in pieces halfway down the nave of the church.  Intruders were disturbed in the course of their nefarious activities, but did not leave empty handed, taking with them three small lions from the base which supported the lectern.

Return
In 1982 the lectern returned to Scotland for the first time in over 400 years.  Permission was given by the Church of England for the lectern to appear in Angels, Nobles and Unicorns, an exhibition of mediaeval Scottish art at the National Museum of Antiquities of Scotland in Edinburgh.  Its appearance at the exhibition caused a great deal of upset and letters to the press demanded that it should remain in Scotland; but when the exhibition ended the lectern was returned to St Stephen's church.

In November 1984, a group of individuals broke into the church and removed the lectern.  The Scottish group "Siol nan Gaidheal" (Seed of the Gael) contacted the press and reported they had the lectern.  They provided a 'hostage' photograph and wrote "... This piece of our heritage is here to stay... patriotic Scots have asked for the eagle to be returned... to its rightful home.  English arrogance won the day... all requests were refused."

In the 15 years after the lectern disappeared the rights and wrongs of the matter were debated on television and in the press many times.  Representatives of the established churches of Scotland and England met on many occasions and invested much effort and time to resolve the matter. Dialogue between all parties was nurtured and helped by the activities of Inverness Press and Journal reporter John Vass. He worked closely with the vicar Revd John Pragnell, David Maxwell, Convenor of the Church of Scotland's Artistic Committee, and David Caldwell of the Royal Museum of Scotland to get the lectern returned for permanent display in Scotland.

Criminal endeavour prevails
Over the years, Vass received a number of anonymous communications from those who held the lectern. The "kidnappers" laid down two conditions before the Dunkeld lectern would be released: that it was to stay in Scotland, and that no action would be taken to find and prosecute those responsible. St Stephen's parish made an offer that should the lectern be forthcoming, the parish would see that it was returned to Scotland.

In recognition of this promise, St Margaret's church, Barnhill, Dundee offered St Stephen's church a Victorian replica of the lectern to replace the one removed in 1984. The "Siol nan Gaidheal" failed to respond positively.  The Church of Scotland decided to proceed, and, in 1995, presented St Stephen's with the Barnhill lectern before Pragnell moved to his new parish. St Stephen's vicar had been pivotal in the efforts to bring about a satisfactory conclusion of this matter since he arrived in the parish in 1991.

Current whereabouts
In 1999, the Dunkeld Lectern mysteriously turned up in an Edinburgh arts centre after being missing for 15 years. It is believed that it had been hidden in a Highland grave for the intervening period.  It has since been moved to the National Museum of Scotland, initially on a three-year loan.

References

Sources

External links
 Photo of top of lectern – FotoFling Scotland at flickr

History of St Albans
Culture of medieval Scotland
Art and cultural repatriation
Collections of the National Museums of Scotland